Sir Walter Sydney Liddall CBE (2 March 1884 – 24 February 1963) was the Conservative Member of Parliament (MP) for Lincoln from 1931 to 1945.

Born in Boston, Lincolnshire, he was educated at De Aston School at Market Rasen. He was a local manager for the Scunthorpe Savings Bank and eventually became the chairman. Liddall died aged 78 in Scunthorpe.

He was awarded CBE in the 1937 Coronation Honours for political and public services.

References

External links 
 

1884 births
1963 deaths
People from Boston, Lincolnshire
People educated at De Aston School
Conservative Party (UK) MPs for English constituencies
UK MPs 1931–1935
UK MPs 1935–1945
Politics of Lincoln, England
Commanders of the Order of the British Empire
Knights Bachelor